Krystle Delgado, popularly known as Miss Krystle, is an American singer, songwriter, music producer, entertainment attorney, and humanitarian.

Career

Miss Krystle spent her childhood in Lake Wildwood in northern California. Miss Krystle was home-schooled until the age of 16, where she took vocal, piano, cello, and violin lessons from her Mother, Joanne Jolee, who is a classically trained musician. Miss Krystle started her own music business at the age of 16 teaching children cello, piano, violin, and vocal lessons.

For her bachelor's degree in political science, Miss Krystle attended Arizona State University completing her honor thesis on her first album "Identity". During this same time period, she competed in Miss America pageants to help pay for school, winning the title of Miss Palo Verde and Miss Sonoran Desert. Miss Krystle was a top 10 finalist two times at Miss Arizona. Miss Krystle went on to receive her Juris Doctor in 2013 from Arizona State University Sandra Day O’Connor College of Law.

In 2011, Miss Krystle wrote, produced, and recorded her second album, Run, and collaborating with music producer, Jason Camiolo. From 2013-2015, Miss Krystle released a number of singles and remixes, collaborating with Grammy Award-winning producers and songwriters, including Gardner Cole. Miss Krystle achieved several No. 1 tracks on Beatport, including her collaboration "Right Movement EP" with KJ Sawka.  
During this time, Miss Krystle played the dive bar circuit with a full band. In 2015, Miss Krystle switched her live show from a full rock band, to a more night-club version of her show, complete with a DJ, lights, props, and dancers. Miss Krystle still performs with a band.

Miss Krystle then independently released her third album in 2016 through Dukes Up Records, Woman in Motion, which has now been added to 72 radio stations across the United States. Produced and co-written by That Orko, the Woman in Motion album received over 500,000 spins on Pandora in its first two months.

In 2016, Miss Krystle officially launched Delgado Entertainment Law, PLLC, an entertainment law firm based in Scottsdale, Arizona. People analogize Miss Krystle to being a superhero: lawyer by day, musician by night, but Miss Krystle says that music will always be her No. 1 passion, priority, and chosen career.

In 2017, Miss Krystle independently released her Inevitable EP through Dukes Up Records, produced and co-written by That Orko. The Inevitable EP was mixed by Jason Goldstein, and mastered by Reuben Cohen with Lurssen Mastering. Some of the notable remixes from that album include Dukes Up (Andy Gerold Remix), a former Marilyn Manson member.

In March 2018, Miss Krystle landed air play on 93.3 Alt Az Radio station for her single, "Relevant" and additionally showcased at SXSW as an SXSW approved artist. Miss Krystle has covered classic songs like "God Only Knows" by The Beach Boys (2018), "Cruel Summer" by Bananarama (2016), and "Soon We’ll Be Found" by Sia (2015).

Her new single "Save Yourself" is due out in Fall 2018, and will be an exploration of her Aggropop sound. Miss Krystle's sound is currently described as aggressive pop, but critics report her songs could easily find a home in any club or favorite Top 40 radio station.

The tattoo on Miss Krystle's left ribs is the official Miss Krystle symbol, which is a number of straight lines, intersecting at a singular point. She would draw this symbol on her wrist during law school as a ritual, in instances of extreme stress, as a reminder to take a refreshed perspective. She says Tony Robbins inspired this "minimalizing" method, and says the symbol reminds her that she is in control of her reality.

Philanthropy and charity 

Miss Krystle began a 501(c)3 child abuse prevention and awareness charitable organization in 2006, Young Ones United, at the age of 16. The charity continues to provide support to children and families in Arizona today.

Vegan lifestyle 

Miss Krystle became vegan in 2013. She said she was suffering from chronic fatigue and extreme digestive issues for years prior, and although she had seen a multitude of doctors and specialists, no one could figure out what was wrong. Miss Krystle says that when she switched to an all plant-based diet, her chronic fatigue and digestive issues disappeared in one week. Miss Krystle promoted a no calorie restriction, high carb lifestyle that focuses on maintaining a healthy metabolism. Miss Krystle notes that she finally made the switch to a vegan lifestyle after discovering the "Raw Till 4" lifestyle and nutritional program started by vegan activist, Freelee the Banana Girl. In 2018, Miss Krystle started Cookin’ Vegan with Miss Krystle YouTube series, where she used to share her vegan recipes with viewers.

Miss Krystle has since given up veganism and has returned to eating meat, citing stress and health problems as reasons for changing back to a non-vegan diet.

Discography 

God Only Knows (2018)
Inevitable EP (2017)
Relevant (2017)
Inevitable (2017)
Woman in Motion (2016)
Baby It's Cold Outside (That Orko Remix) (2016)
Baby It's Cold Outside (2016)
Dukes Up (2016)
Cruel Summer (2016)
Dukes Up (Andy Gerold Remix) (2016) 
Dukes Up (Rimedag Remix) (2016)
Swear Remix EP (2016)
Don't Leave (Rimedag Remix) (2016)
Right Movement EP (2016)
Take Me Home (KJ Sawka Remix) (2015)
Take Me Home (Rimedag Remix) (2015) 
Soon We'll Be Found (2015)
Don't Leave (Bugs Gregory After Hours Remix) (2015)
Take Me Home (2014) 
Unforgettable (Acoustic Version) (2014)
Don't Leave (Extended Version) (2014) 
Don't Leave (It's Gonna Kill Me) (KJ Sawka Remix) (2014)
Don't Leave (It's Gonna Kill Me) (2014) 
Unforgettable Remix EP (2014)
Unforgettable (2014) 
Memo (Silent J Festival Remix) (2014) 
Memo (London Social Club Remix) (2014) 
Memo (STWTS Remix) (2014) 
Memo (2014) 
Bad Girl (2013) 
Kiss Me Boy (2013)
I Don't Cry (2011)
Run (2011) 
Identity (2010)

References

External links 
 

Year of birth missing (living people)
Living people
American women singer-songwriters
American singer-songwriters
21st-century American women